These are records for Grand Slam tournaments, also known as majors, which are the four most prestigious annual tennis events: Australian Open, French Open, Wimbledon, and US Open. All records are based on official data from the majors. The names of active players appear in boldface for their career totals and currently active streaks.

Singles career totals (all time)

Men's singles

Women's singles

Career title leaders timeline

Most singles titles and finals (all time) 
Includes all players with at least two singles titles.

In the following tables:
 "AU" means the Australian Open or the Australian Championships.
 "FR" means the French Open or the French Championships.
 "WB" means Wimbledon.
 "US" means the US Open or the United States Championships.
 "W" means the person was the champion, i.e., the winning finalist.
 "F" means the person was the runner-up, i.e., the losing finalist.
 "NP" means the person never participated in that Grand Slam event.

Men

Women

Records across all disciplines (all time)

Most titles 
Players with at least 18 titles in any combination.

Most wins per event 

1 Margaret Court's (1965 and 1969) and Owen Davidson's (1965) Australian mixed doubles titles were unplayed finals.

Most titles in a year
In 1965, Margaret Court won a record nine titles out of twelve available to a player in the same year: the singles, doubles and mixed doubles at all four Grand Slam tournaments. In 1985, Martina Navratilova reached the final in all Grand Slam events held that year, equaling the record of eleven final appearances set by Court in 1963 and repeated a year later. 

Only twelve unique players (nine women and three men) have won at least six major championships in one calendar year.

Triple Crown
The Triple Crown refers to winning the singles, doubles, and mixed doubles titles at one event, in the same week. This has become an increasingly rare accomplishment in the sport, partly because the final matches in all three disciplines often likely take place concurrently in the same day, and not in separate days. Doris Hart for example attained her first Triple Crown after playing three Wimbledon final matches held in one single day.

Notes:
 This list excludes the 1909 Triple Crown of Jeanne Matthey at Roland Garros and the 1920, 1921, 1922 and 1923 Triple Crown wins of Suzanne Lenglen at Roland Garros. The French Championship tennis tournament at the time was a domestic competition not recognized as an international major. At the time, the major clay court event (actual precursor of the French Open in its current international format) was the World Hard Court Championships, where Suzanne Lenglen also attained a Triple Crown in 1921 and 1922.
 Also the 1941 triple championship of Alice Weiwers isn't listed due to its disputed official status: French major championships held in Vichy France from 1941 to 1945 aren't currently recognized by the Fédération Française de Tennis.

Men

Women

Most singles titles (Open Era) 

Players with at least 5 singles titles during the Open Era.

Most singles finals (Open Era) 

Players who reached at least 10 singles finals during the Open Era. Titles won are within parentheses.

Miscellaneous records

Youngest and oldest champions

Men

Women

Won a title without losing a set

Chronological

Men's doubles (Open Era)

Won a title at first appearance 
These players won the title the first time they played in that particular Grand Slam tournament (in the main draw).

Men

Women

Won a title at final appearance 
These players won the title of the final Grand Slam tournament they played.

Men

Women

Won a title after saving match points 
These players saved at least one match point during their listed title runs. The accompanying number of match points saved and final match score are also listed.

Men

Women

Fewest career first-round losses 

Must have won at least 2 singles titles and played at least 20 first round matches (does not include second round matches after a bye in the first round, walkovers, or challenge rounds).

Participation

Men

Women

Most doubles titles (all time)

Per team 
Pairs that won at least four titles together.

1 The team of René Lacoste and Jean Borotra also won three men's doubles titles at the French Championships.

Per player 
Players with at least four titles.

Men

Women

Most mixed doubles titles (all time)

Per team 
Pairs that won at least four titles together.

1 This was an unplayed 1969 Australian Open final, officially credited as a title.

Per player 
Players with at least four titles.

Men

Women

Wheelchair records

Men's singles

Women's singles

Men's doubles

Women's doubles

Quad singles

Quad doubles

Grand Slam, Year-End Championship and Olympics

Career Golden Slam
A player who wins all four Grand Slam tournaments and the Olympic gold medal (or a Paralympic gold medal) during his or her career is said to have achieved a "Career Golden Slam".
 The event at which the Career Golden Slam was achieved is indicated in bold below:

Career Super Slam
A player who wins all four Grand Slam tournaments, the Olympic gold medal and the year-end championship throughout his or her career is said to have achieved a "Career Super Slam".
 The event at which the Career Super Slam was achieved indicated in bold below:

See also 

 Lists of tennis records and statistics
 List of Grand Slam men's singles champions
 List of Grand Slam women's singles champions
 List of Grand Slam men's doubles champions
 List of Grand Slam women's doubles champions
 List of Grand Slam mixed doubles champions

References

External links
 Official website of the Australian Open
 Official website of the French Open
 Official website of Wimbledon
 Official website of the US Open

Tennis records and statistics
Records